The Christmas Is Here Tour (stylized Christmas Is Here! Tour) was the eighth concert tour by American a cappella group Pentatonix to promote their seventh studio album, Christmas Is Here!. The tour began on November 25, 2018 in Grand Prairie, and concluded on December 22, 2018 in New York City.

Background and development
On September 20, 2018, the group announced they were releasing Christmas Is Here!. With announcement was a limited 17 date tour.

A review of the Sugar Land performance stated "People could not stop cheering for the a cappella group. Pentatonix brought Christmas to life in November."

Tour dates

References

2018 concert tours
Pentatonix concert tours